Family Guy is an American animated television sitcom created by Seth MacFarlane for the Fox Broadcasting Company. The series centers on the dysfunctional Griffin family, which consists of father Peter (MacFarlane), mother Lois (Alex Borstein), daughter Meg (Lacey Chabert in episodes 1–9, then Mila Kunis from episode 10 onwards), son Chris (Seth Green), baby Stewie (MacFarlane), and Brian (MacFarlane), the family dog. The show is set in the fictional town of Quahog, Rhode Island, and lampoons American culture in the form of cutaway gags, science fiction and tangential vignettes.

The concept of Family Guy was conceived by MacFarlane in 1995 while studying animation at the Rhode Island School of Design. He created two shorts entitled The Life of Larry and Larry & Steve, both of which played a key role in Fox executives' decision to pick up the series in 1998. After two seasons, Fox decided to cancel the show. Despite the cancellation, a third season was produced, after which the series was officially cancelled at the end of the 2001–2002 season. Reruns on Cartoon Network's block Adult Swim drove up interest, and a letter-writing campaign, along with impressive DVD sales, encouraged Fox to bring the show back for the 2005–2006 television season.

Family Guy and its cast have been nominated for twenty-seven Primetime Emmy Awards, winning eight. MacFarlane won the Outstanding Voice-Over Performance award for his performance as Stewie, MacFarlane and Walter Murphy won the Outstanding Music and Lyrics award for the song "You Got a Lot to See" from the episode "Brian Wallows and Peter's Swallows", Steven Fonti won the Outstanding Individual Achievement in Animation award for his storyboard work in the episode "No Chris Left Behind", Greg Colton won the Outstanding Individual Achievement in Animation award for his storyboard work in the episode "Road to the Multiverse", Patrick S. Clark and Jim Fitzpatrick won the Outstanding Sound Mixing for a Comedy or Drama Series (Half-Hour) and Animation award for their sound mixing work on the episode "Road to the North Pole", and MacFarlane won the Outstanding Character Voice-Over Performance award for his performances in the episode "Pilling Them Softly". The show was nominated for twelve Annies, and won three times, twice in 2006 and once in 2008. In 2009, it was nominated for an Emmy for Outstanding Comedy Series, becoming the first animated program to be nominated in this category since The Flintstones in 1961.

 The series remains Fox's second-longest-running program, behind The Simpsons. It also remains the fourth-longest-running scripted primetime series in North America. On May 11, 2020, Fox renewed the series for a nineteenth season, which premiered on September 27, 2020 and ended on May 16, 2021. On September 23, 2020, Fox announced that the show would continue through a twentieth and twenty-first season, and was later renewed for seasons 22 and 23 on January 26, 2023.

Series overview

Episodes

Season 1 (1999)

Season 2 (1999–2000)

Season 3 (2001–03)

Season 4 (2005–06)

Season 5 (2006–07)

Season 6 (2007–08)

Season 7 (2008–09)

Season 8 (2009–10)

Season 9 (2010–11)

Season 10 (2011–12)

Season 11 (2012–13)

Season 12 (2013–14)

Season 13 (2014–15)

Season 14 (2015–16)

Season 15 (2016–17)

Season 16 (2017–18)

Season 17 (2018–19)

Season 18 (2019–20)

Season 19 (2020–21)

Season 20 (2021–22)

Season 21 (2022–23)

Unscheduled episodes

Specials

See also
 List of Family Guy home video releases

Notes

References

External links

 Family Guy at Fox.com

 
Family Guy
Family Guy